Donald Lyman Burkholder (January 19, 1927 – April 14, 2013) was an American mathematician known for his contributions to probability theory, particularly the theory of martingales. The Burkholder–Davis–Gundy inequality is co-named after him. Burkholder spent most of his professional career as a professor in the Department of Mathematics of the University of Illinois at Urbana-Champaign. After his retirement in 1998, Donald Burkholder remained a professor emeritus in the Department of Mathematics of the University of Illinois at Urbana-Champaign and a CAS Professor Emeritus of Mathematics at the Center for Advanced Study, University of Illinois at Urbana-Champaign. He was a member of the U.S. National Academy of Sciences and a fellow of the American Mathematical Society.

Biographical data

Burkholder received a PhD in statistics in 1955 from the University of North Carolina at Chapel Hill, under the direction of Wassily Hoeffding.
He was appointed an assistant professor in the Department of Mathematics at the University of Illinois at Urbana-Champaign in 1955 where he remained until his retirement in 1998.

Burkholder delivered an invited lecture at the International Congress of Mathematicians in 1970,  a Wald Lecture at the Institute of Mathematical Statistics in 1971, a  Mordell Lecture at  Cambridge University in  1986, and a Zygmund Lecture at the  University of Chicago in 1988.

Donald Burkholder was elected a member of the U.S. National Academy of Sciences in 1992. The same year he was elected a fellow of the American Academy of Arts and Sciences. On December 20, 2010, Burkholder was elected a Fellow of the American Association for the Advancement of Science for "distinguished contributions to probability theory, particularly the theory of martingales, and his work in stochastic processes, functional analysis, and Fourier analysis."

In 2009 Burkholder was named a SIAM Fellow by the Society for Industrial and Applied Mathematics "for advances in martingale transforms and applications of probabilistic methods in analysis".

Burkholder was an editor (1964–1967) of the journal Annals of Mathematical Statistics. He served as the president of the Institute of Mathematical Statistics in 1975–76. He is a Fellow of the  Institute of Mathematical Statistics.

Selected publications
Burkholder, D. L.; Gundy, Richard F.,  Extrapolation and interpolation of quasi-linear operators on martingales. Acta Mathematica, vol. 124 (1970), pp. 249–304
Burkholder, Donald L., Inequalities for operators on martingales. Actes du Congrès International des Mathématiciens (Nice, 1970), Tome 2, pp. 551–557. Gauthier-Villars, Paris, 1971.
Burkholder, Donald L., Distribution function inequalities for martingales, Annals of Probability,  vol. 1 (1973), pp. 19–42
Burkholder, Donald L., A geometrical characterization of Banach spaces in which martingale difference sequences are unconditional. Annals of Probability, vol. 9 (1981), no. 6, pp. 997–1011
Burkholder, Donald L., Explorations in martingale theory and its applications. École d'Été de Probabilités de Saint-Flour XIX-1989, pp. 1–66, Lecture Notes in Mathematics, vol. 1464, Springer-Verlag, Berlin, 1991

See also
Martingales
Burkholder–Davis–Gundy inequality

References

External links
Burkholder's personal web page, Department of Mathematics, University of Illinois at Urbana-Champaign
Donald L. Burkholder, CAS Professor Emeritus of Mathematics, Center for Advanced Study, University of Illinois at Urbana-Champaign

20th-century American mathematicians
21st-century American mathematicians
Members of the United States National Academy of Sciences
Probability theorists
University of Illinois Urbana-Champaign faculty
Presidents of the Institute of Mathematical Statistics
University of North Carolina at Chapel Hill alumni
Fellows of the American Mathematical Society
2013 deaths
1927 births